Buto may refer to:
Buto, an Ancient Egyptian city
Buto, another name for the Egyptian goddess Wadjet
Butoh, a modern Japanese form of dance